is a town in Miyagi Prefecture, Japan. , the town had an estimated population of 13,804 in 5663 households,  and a population density of 260 persons per km². It is most famous as the location of Matsushima Bay, one of the Three Views of Japan, and is also the site of the Zuigan-ji, Entsū-in and Kanrantei.

Geography
Matsushima is located in east-central Miyagi Prefecture, with Matsushima Bay to the east. The town’s highest point is Mount Danyama, with a height of 178 meters.

Neighboring municipalities
Miyagi Prefecture
Higashimatsushima
Misato
Ōsaki
Ōsato
Rifu

Climate
Matsushima has a humid climate (Köppen climate classification Cfa) characterized by mild summers and cold winters.  The average annual temperature in Higashi-Matsushima is 12.0 °C. The average annual rainfall is 1207 mm with September as the wettest month. The temperatures are highest on average in August, at around 24.5 °C, and lowest in January, at around 0.6 °C.

Demographics
Per Japanese census data, the population of Matsushima has declined over the past 30 years.

History
The area of present-day Matsushima was part of ancient Mutsu Province and has been settled since at least the Jōmon period. The Daigigakoi Shell Mound is one of the largest shell middens to have been discovered in Japan. With the establishment of Tagajō in the Nara period, Matsushima was part of the Yamato colonization area in the region. The Buddhist temple of Zuigan-ji comes to have been founded in 828 AD. During the Sengoku period, the area was contested by samurai clans before it came under the control of the Date clan of Sendai Domain during the Edo period, under the Tokugawa shogunate.

The village of Matsushima within Miyagi District, Miyagi was established on June 1, 1889 with the post-Meiji restoration establishment of the modern municipalities system. It was raised to town status on December 16, 1963.

Government
Matsushima has a mayor-council form of government with a directly elected mayor and a unicameral town council of 14 members. Matsushima, as part of Miyagi District contributes one seat to the Miyagi Prefectural legislature. In terms of national politics, the town is part of Miyagi 5th district of the lower house of the Diet of Japan.

Economy
The economy of Matsushima is largely based on tourism, farming, and commercial fishing, primarily the cultivation of oysters in Matsushima Bay.

Education
Matsushima has three public elementary schools and one public middle school operated by the town government and one public high school operated by the Miyagii Prefectural Board of Education.

Transportation

Railway
 East Japan Railway Company (JR East) - Tōhoku Main Line 
 East Japan Railway Company (JR East) - Senseki Line 

Highway
  (Matsushima-Ōsato IC — Matsushima-Kita IC)

Seaports
Port of Matsushima - Matsushima sightseeing boats

Local attractions
Matsushima, one of the Three Views of Japan
Zuigan-ji, founded 828 AD
Entsū-in
Nishinohama Shell Mound, a National Historic Site

External relations

International sister cities
 – Isle of Pines, New Caledonia, since September 4, 1980

Japanese sister cities
August 1, 1987: Kisakata, Akita
October 16, 1988: Kamiamakusa, Kumamoto (formerly known as Matsushima)

Noted people from Matsushima 
Jun Senoue, musician

References

External links

Official Website 

 
Towns in Miyagi Prefecture
Populated coastal places in Japan